The Liberation War Memorial Sculpture (Bengali: মুক্তিযুদ্ধের স্মৃতি ভাস্কর্য) was made by Mahmudul Hasan Shohag in 2010. It is 15 feet high and is located in Durgapur, Bangladesh.

The sculpture is a tribute to Bangladeshi fighters who died during the Liberation War.

References 

Asian sculpture
 
South Asia
Sculpture

Sculptures by Mahmudul Hasan Shohag